Cherine Abdellaoui (born 28 August 1998) is an Algerian Paralympic judoka. She won the gold medal in the women's 52 kg event at the 2020 Summer Paralympics held in Tokyo, Japan. She also represented Algeria at the 2016 Summer Paralympics held in Rio de Janeiro, Brazil and she won a bronze medal in the women's 52 kg event.

In 2019, she won the silver medal at the IBSA Judo Grand Prix held in Baku, Azerbaijan, the opening event of the IBSA Judo season.

References

External links 
 

1998 births
Living people
Algerian female judoka
Paralympic judoka of Algeria
Paralympic gold medalists for Algeria
Paralympic bronze medalists for Algeria
Paralympic medalists in judo
Judoka at the 2016 Summer Paralympics
Judoka at the 2020 Summer Paralympics
Medalists at the 2016 Summer Paralympics
Medalists at the 2020 Summer Paralympics
Place of birth missing (living people)
21st-century Algerian women